"La bonne du curé"  ("The priest's maid") is a song performed by Belgian singer Annie Cordy. The song was written by Charles Level and the music was made by Tony Montoya and Tony Roval.  The song was released in France and Belgium on 1974. The song hit the number 1 spot on Belgian and French charts.

References

1974 singles
Annie Cordy songs
SNEP Top Singles number-one singles
1974 songs
CBS Records singles